Parliamentary elections were held in Poland on 16 November 1930, with Senate elections held a week later on 23 November. In what became known as the Brest elections, the pro-Sanation Nonpartisan Bloc for Cooperation with the Government took 47% of the vote and 249 of the 444 seats in Sejm and 77 of the 111 seats in the Senate. The elections are known as the least free elections in the Second Polish Republic due to the Brest trial controversy.

Controversy
The elections were rigged by the pro-Sanacja elements in the Polish government under the control of Józef Piłsudski (although Piłsudski left most of the details of the internal politics to others). After the BBWR came up well short of a majority in the 1928 elections, Sanacja and Piłsudski left nothing to chance.

The elections were supposed to take place in May, but the government invalidated the May results by disbanding the parliament in August and with increasing pressure on the opposition started a new campaign, the new elections being scheduled to November. Using the anti-government demonstrations as a pretext, 20 members of the oppositions, including most of the leaders of Centrolew alliance (from the Polish Socialist Party, Polish People's Party "Piast" and Polish People's Party "Wyzwolenie") were arrested in September without a warrant, only on the order of the minister of internal security, Felicjan Sławoj Składkowski accusing them of plotting an anti-government coup. The opposition members (who included the former prime minister Wincenty Witos, and the Silesian national hero, Wojciech Korfanty) were imprisoned in the Brest Fortress, where their trial took place (thus the popular name for the election: the 'Brest election'). A number of less known activists were arrested throughout the country. They were released after the end of the election in the same month. The Brest trial ended in January 1932, with 10 accused receiving sentences up to three years of imprisonment. Some of them decided to emigrate instead.

In addition, the minorities were also discriminated against; the government crackdown on opposition was especially hard in the eastern provinces, affecting the Blok Ukraińsko-Białoruski (Ukrainian-Belarusian Bloc) party.

On 24 November 1930, Time, in its coverage of the elections, wrote:
<blockquote> During the campaign which ended in Poland's general election last week, opposition papers were so mercilessly censored that some were reduced to printing pictures of Friederich Nietzsche (1844-1900) with the caption: He Died Crazy. Because Dictator Jozef Pilsudski has publicly made such statements as that "Parliament is a prostitute!" (Time, July 9, 1928) and because he somewhat resembles Philosopher Nietzsche in face and whiskers, his government promptly confiscated all Nietzschean campaign pictures, all papers in which they appeared. </blockquote>

Nonetheless despite the governments pressure, the opposition members (from Centrolew and endecja'') still sat in the parliament, soon in the new parliament they tried to pass the motion of no confidence to the new government. The imprisonment and trial of political opponents was a setback for Polish democracy, but no genuinely open trials of political opponents such as the one in Poland took place elsewhere in contemporary Central Europe The exception was the 1933 Berlin trial of the Bulgarian communist Georgy M. Dimitrov. The success of BBWR, while certainly enhanced by the government crackdown on opposition, also stemmed from the fact that Sanacja and Piłsudski's held considerable support, and the Centrolew politicians were viewed as incapable in preventing the economic crisis (Great Depression). The Centrolew coalition fell apart in 1931 due to internal conflicts.

Results

Sejm

Senate

References

External links
The results

Poland
Parliamentary elections in Poland
1930 in Poland
Election and referendum articles with incomplete results
November 1930 events
1930 elections in Poland